Claude Iff (born 1946) is a Swiss former footballer who played in the 1960s as goalkeeper.

Iff joined FC Basel's first team for their 1968–69 season under player-manager Helmut Benthaus. After playing in one test match, Iff played his domestic league debut for the club in the home game at the St. Jakob Stadium on 31 August 1968 as Basel against Grasshopper Club. In the 20th minute there was a five-minute interval for the nursing of goalkeeper Jean-Paul Laufenburger after a collision with Schneeberger, whereupon Basel's keeper had to be carried away with a concussion. Iff was substituted in and Basel were 0–1 down at this time. Iff kept a clean sheet and Basel managed a 1–1 draw.

In his one season with the first team, Iff played a total of five games for Basel. Only one of these games were in the Nationalliga A and the others were friendly games.

References

Sources
 Die ersten 125 Jahre. Publisher: Josef Zindel im Friedrich Reinhardt Verlag, Basel. 
 Verein "Basler Fussballarchiv" Homepage
(NB: Despite all efforts, the editors of these books and the authors in "Basler Fussballarchiv" have failed to be able to identify all the players, their date and place of birth or date and place of death, who played in the games during the early years of FC Basel)

FC Basel players
Swiss men's footballers
Association football goalkeepers
1946 births
Living people